Edinburgh Trams is a tramway in Edinburgh, Scotland, operated by Edinburgh Trams Ltd. It is a  line between St Andrew Square in the New Town and Edinburgh Airport, with 15 stops.

First discussed in 1998 and designed over the next decade, construction began in June 2008, and after encountering delays it opened on 31 May 2014. The scheme had an initial estimated cost of £375 million in 2003, but by May 2008, when contracts were signed, the cost had risen to £521 million. The final cost after delays was £776 million.

After running for two years, the scheme had achieved pre-tax profitability (excluding maintenance and infrastructure costs) and exceeded the original ridership targets. It has run at an operating loss since 2018 (e.g. − £9.4 million in 2018). On 14 March 2019, Edinburgh Council voted to approve the extension of the existing line from York Place to Newhaven.  The extended line is due to be operational by early 2023.

History

Background

Edinburgh and Leith were originally served by horse-drawn coaches, and then from 1871 various companies and corporations ran trams that were horse-drawn, then cable driven and finally electric, until 16 November 1956. After that date, public transport consisted of buses and a limited network of commuter rail lines.

Towards the end of the 20th century, there was revived interest in trams in the United Kingdom and networks were reintroduced in Birmingham, Croydon, Manchester, Nottingham and Sheffield.
Proposals for a network in Edinburgh were made in the 1990s, and a plan to build a line along Princes Street and Leith Walk to Newhaven was proposed in 1999 by the City of Edinburgh Council, Lothian and Edinburgh Enterprise and the New Edinburgh Tramways Company.

Proposals and agreement

A 2001 proposal envisaged three routes, lines 1, 2 and 3. The first was a circular route around the northern suburbs, and the others were radial routes to Newbridge in the west and Newcraighall in the south. All lines would have passed through the city centre. In May 2004, a 15-year operating contract was awarded to Transdev, to operate and maintain the tram network. This contract was cancelled in 2009.

Two bills to reintroduce a tram network were passed by the Scottish Parliament in March 2006. Lines 1 and 2 received parliamentary permission, but funding the entire network was deemed impossible. Line 3, to be paid for by a proposed Edinburgh congestion charge, was scrapped when the charge was heavily defeated in a referendum and construction of the remaining two lines was split into four phases:

Phase 1a  from Newhaven to Edinburgh Airport via Princes Street, combining parts of lines 1 and 2
Phase 1b  from Haymarket to Granton Square via Crewe Toll, comprising most of the remainder of line 1
Phase 2 linking Granton Square and Newhaven, completing the line 1 loop
Phase 3 extending the airport line to Newbridge, completing line 2

The future of the scheme came under threat in 2007, when the Scottish National Party (SNP) published its manifesto for the Scottish Parliamentary election. The party made clear its intention to cancel the scheme, along with the Edinburgh Airport Rail Link, to save £1.1 billion.

Following a lost vote in the Scottish Parliament, the SNP-led minority Scottish Government agreed to continue the line from the airport to Leith on condition that no more public money would be supplied. A report by Audit Scotland, commissioned by the Scottish Government, confirmed that the cost projections were sound. The cost of the scheme in 2003 was estimated at £498 million, £375 million in funding from the Scottish Government and £45 million from Edinburgh Council.

On 25 October 2007, the council approved the final business case. Approval was given on 22 December 2007 for TIE to sign contracts with CAF to supply vehicles and BBS (a consortium of Bilfinger Berger and Siemens) to design and construct the network. Contract negotiations finished in April 2008, and construction started in June 2008. By this stage the cost of the project was estimated at £521 million. Funding problems and political disputes led to the scaling back of the original plans. In April 2009, the council cancelled phase 1b, citing revenue shortfall created by the economic slowdown to save an estimated £75 million. The Granton extension was also cancelled.

Construction: 2007–2012

Until August 2011, the project was overseen by Transport Initiatives Edinburgh (TIE), a company wholly owned by the City of Edinburgh Council, who were responsible for project-managing the construction of the tramway.

After the draft business case was accepted by the Scottish Government in March 2007, initial construction work commenced in July 2007, with the diversion of underground utilities in preparation for track-laying in Leith. These works followed a plan by System Design Services (SDS), a joint design team led by Parsons Brinckerhoff and Halcrow Group.

In May 2008, final contracts to build the tram system were awarded to BSC, a consortium of Bilfinger Berger, Siemens and Spanish tram builder Construcciones y Auxiliar de Ferrocarriles (CAF).

The tramway uses a mix of street running and segregated off-road track, with conventional tram stop platforms. Stops are fitted with shelters, ticket machines, lighting and CCTV. The network is operated from a depot in Gogar, close to the A8 roundabout, immediately west of Edinburgh Gateway tram stop.

The route of the line required the construction of bridges to cross railway lines at Edinburgh Park and Stenhouse, and a tunnel under the A8 near the Gogar roundabout. A bridge at Balgreen was widened. Works to build a tram interchange at Haymarket station involved the demolition of a Category C(S) listed building, the former Caledonian Alehouse on Haymarket Terrace.

Some on-street track was laid in a special foundation with cobbled road surfacing designed to be sympathetic with the style of Edinburgh streets but was removed in many places due to objections from cyclists. The trams are powered by overhead cables attached to purpose-built poles or mounted on the sides of buildings. Nine electrical sub-stations were planned for the line to Newhaven, both underground and above-ground but only five were built after the line was truncated at York Place.

Revisions and delays
In 2008 and 2009, the project met with delays to work on tramway infrastructure. Phase 1b of the project was cancelled because of a funding shortfall in April 2009. Contractual disputes delayed track-laying in the city centre. In December 2009, media reported that the project budget was running over £545 million, and the system was unlikely to come into operation until February 2012 or later. The operating contract with Transdev was cancelled in December 2009 to reduce costs and it was announced that the trams would be operated by Edinburgh Trams Limited, a subsidiary of Transport for Edinburgh. In March 2010, Bilfinger Berger announced that the estimated completion date would be in 2014.

Contractual disputes
In February 2009, work on the Princes Street section stopped due to contractual disagreements between TIE and BSC after the latter submitted a request for an additional £80 million of funding. Edinburgh Council believed the contractors' claims were unjustified as they had agreed to fixed-price contracts. After negotiations, BSC agreed to commence construction in March 2009 within the original budget, although disagreements remained. Work restarted and line construction went ahead.

In August 2009, TIE began legal proceedings against the BSC consortium over delays to the project, and track-laying on Leith Walk, Shandwick Place and Haymarket was suspended. At issue were alleged changes to BSC's work specification, including track works on Princes Street and £5 million additional costs for foundation work near Murrayfield Stadium. The BSC consortium alleged that TIE had not diverted the underground utilities in time for track-laying to begin, breaching contractual agreements and costing the consortium additional staffing expenditure.

In January 2010 the independent arbiter found in favour of TIE on some points, but on most of the disputed issues ruled in favour of BSC and awarded the consortium 90% of its additional costs, estimated to be up to £80m.

Delays in track laying and depot construction affected vehicle testing. By September 2009, construction was reported to be nine months behind schedule, and CAF was due to deliver the first trams from its factory in Spain. With key project dependency out of synchronisation, TIE held discussions with Transport for London about delivering the trams to Croydon to conduct operational tests on the Tramlink network. Tram vehicle testing commenced in March 2010 on the Siemens test track in Wildenrath, Germany. The tests included recreating the steep gradients of Leith Walk, and using weights to simulate the heavy passenger load expected during a Murrayfield match day.

Funding crisis

Following further disputes and delays, it was reported in March 2010 that Edinburgh Council was considering cancelling the contract with Bilfinger Berger. By June 2010, the project's cost had risen to £600 million. Council project managers were reported to be in crisis talks, considering options including: borrowing £55 million to fund the increased costs; phasing the introduction of the tram line, so that trams would initially run between the airport and Haymarket; and terminating the contract with Bilfinger Berger. The council asked TIE to draw up costs for truncating the line at four places: Haymarket station, York Place, the foot of Leith Walk or Ocean Terminal.

Work resumed in May 2011 at priority locations, Haymarket Yards and Gogar, while the project's future was decided by the council. In August 2011 it was announced TIE would be disbanded and consultants Turner & Townsend would manage the project.

On 30 June 2011, Edinburgh Council voted to continue the line between Edinburgh Airport and St Andrew Square. Costs rose to an estimated £770m, leaving the council with a shortfall of more than £200m. The option to scrap the project was considered, but rejected. On 25 August 2011, the council voted to cut the line to run between the airport and Haymarket, reducing the expected cost to £715m. A week later, after the Scottish Government threatened to withhold £72 million of funding, the council reversed its decision, restoring the terminus at St Andrew Square. On 29 November 2011 it was announced that the eastern terminus would be at York Place instead of St Andrew Square; the intention had been to build the tracks to a reversing point at York Place (without a stop for passengers). Extending passenger services from St Andrew Square to York Place would enable Broughton Street, Picardy Place and the surrounding area to be better served at comparatively little additional cost.

The first electric wires were energised in October 2011 within the depot at Gogar. Testing trams began in December 2011 near the depot at Gogar, on a  length of track. On 15 December 2011, the contractors handed the depot to the City of Edinburgh Council.

The first completed section of line, between the depot and Edinburgh Airport, was used to test a tram at full speed on 19 December 2012.

With extra interest payments factored in, the cost of the line was expected to exceed £1 billion.

Criticism

Delays in construction were criticised by businesses, who claimed their income was damaged by long-term road closures in the centre of the city, and also by some residents.

Cycling groups voiced safety concerns after people were injured as their bicycle wheels became caught in the track. They reported the road surface around the tracks was crumbling, raising further safety problems. In response, TiE promised to carry out repairs and Edinburgh Trams agreed to fund special training for cyclists. In 2017, a woman was crushed to death by a passing bus when her bicycle wheel was caught in the tracks. Further safety concerns were raised by residents along the routes about the suspension of overhead electric cables from residential buildings, and some property owners refused permission for cables to be attached.

To remedy crumbling tarmac along the tracks on Princes Street, the road was closed in September 2011 and remained closed for ten months. A road closure between Haymarket and Shandwick Place in March 2012 led to complaints from businesses and residents. It remained closed until October 2013. Originally to open as Shandwick Place tram stop, it was renamed West End - Princes Street prior to opening at the request of local traders, who felt the new name had greater associations to the city centre and would encourage more tourists to get off there. The stop was renamed again in August 2019 as West End.

Completion: 2013–2014
From late 2012, work continued mostly on schedule. In June 2013, overhead electric wires were installed on the city centre portion of the route. This was considered the last major step in the construction process.

Controversy erupted over concessionary travel for the elderly and disabled. Originally, it was planned that concessionary travel, that is the ability of those with a Scottish National Entitlement Card to travel on public transport free-of-charge, was not going to be offered on the tramway. This was despite the fact that Edinburgh Trams is to be run by Lothian Buses, who are mandated to offer free travel to those with concession cards on all their bus routes. This revelation quickly caused city leaders to support an Edinburgh Evening News campaign to ensure that concessionary travel would be offered on the new tramway. City transport convener Lesley Hinds stated "People in Edinburgh have paid through their council tax and their taxes for the trams to get up and running and it would be wrong for a large proportion of the population not to be allowed to use their concessionary bus pass".

Despite this, the Scottish Government refused to pay for concessionary travel for the tram scheme, as it does for all bus routes in Scotland. Talks between the Scottish Government and Edinburgh Council eventually decided that concession cards should be valid for tram travel, but that they should be paid for by the Council instead of the Government. It was revealed on 15 August 2013 that the cards would be valid, and that travel would be paid for by Edinburgh Council. However, only people with cards issued in Edinburgh would be able to use them. This compromise upset many people in the Lothians, who often commute or travel into Edinburgh.

Works were two months ahead of schedule by September 2013, when Edinburgh Council announced the tramway would open by May 2014. All tram and road works were completed by 19 October with testing of the trams between the depot and Edinburgh Park commencing on 8 October 2013. This was followed by the energising of tram wires from Bankhead tram stop to York Place on 19 November, marking the first time that the route was completely energised. Testing along the full length of the route began on 5 December.

The tramway opened to passengers on 31 May 2014.

A non-statutory public inquiry to scrutinise the delivery of the project was announced on 5 June 2014. This was subsequently upgraded by the Scottish Government on 7 November 2014 to a statutory inquiry to ensure that key personnel would provide evidence.

Extension from city centre to Newhaven

Edinburgh Council stated on 17 March 2014 that works would be conducted along Leith Walk to prepare it for a possible future extension of tram service. In December 2014, Edinburgh Council ordered a detailed business case for extending the line to Leith. The council said in July 2015 that three options for an extension to Leith had been costed. These were a £144.7 million extension to Newhaven, a £126.6 million extension to Ocean Terminal, or a £78.7 million extension to the Foot of Leith Walk.

In 2017 the business case to extend the system to Newhaven was approved. 

In June 2018, Colin Beattie, the MSP for Midlothian North and Musselburgh backed plans to extend the tram system to Musselburgh.

In March 2019, Edinburgh Council approved extending the system from York Place to Newhaven, with the line due to be operational by early 2023. Preliminary works to Constitution Street and Leith Walk started in November 2019. Work was suspended in March 2020 due to the coronavirus pandemic but was restarted in June 2020.

In February 2022, the eastern terminating York Place stop was permanently closed for demolition and to enable connection to the Newhaven extension which will relocate the York Place stop to Picardy Place. Services initially terminated at the West End stop (between February and April 2022), before being extended to the St Andrew Square stop, the current terminus (until the Newhaven extension opens in 2023); however, trams still run to York Place to turn back.

After the completion of tracklaying and the installation of the overhead power lines, the first test tram travelled down the extended line (at walking pace) from York Place to Newhaven on 13 March 2023, becoming the first tram to run in Leith since the closure of the original tramway system.

Current line

Route

The single,  route begins running on-street at York Place, in the city centre. It turns into North St Andrew Street, crosses St Andrew Square. From the square, it heads southeast into Princes Street, and west along the street toward Haymarket, via Shandwick Place, Atholl Place and West Maitland Street. At Haymarket, the route heads onto a segregated track parallel to the Glasgow to Edinburgh mainline. There, it leaves the railway line on a segregated track and heads north to Gogar Roundabout from where it heads northwest via Ingliston Park and Ride to Edinburgh Airport, where it terminates.

An additional tram stop was opened in December 2016 in the Gogar area, between the Gyle Centre and Gogarburn tram stops. This stop, called Edinburgh Gateway, is situated alongside a new railway station on the Fife Circle Line to form a transport interchange between Edinburgh Trams and the Fife Circle and Edinburgh to Aberdeen Lines.  After this stop opened, crews changed here rather than at the special short platform which had been constructed alongside the nearby Gogar depot.  Thus, the additional stop at Edinburgh Gateway did not affect the end-to-end running time between the Airport and York Place.

Stops

Former stops

Frequencies and journey times
Services operate between 05:00 and midnight, at 7- to 10-minute intervals 7 days a week (the period during which the interval is every 7 minutes is shorter on Sunday than on other days). 
Journey times are approximately 30 to 35 minutes from the city centre to the airport. The first morning services commence at the Gyle Centre and the last evening services terminate at Edinburgh Airport from York Place and Edinburgh Gateway on city-bound services after 22:48 from the Airport. During the Festival, trams run later on Friday and Saturday nights. Service frequencies are usually extended to every 3 minutes before and after events at Murrayfield Stadium.

Rolling stock

Current fleet
Edinburgh Trams currently operates a fleet of 27 trams, as follows:

CAF Urbos 3

A £40 million contract to build 27 Urbos 3 trams, sufficient for phase 1a and (unbuilt) 1b lines, was awarded to CAF. When the line was cut back to York Place, only 17 trams would be needed. An unsuccessful attempt was made in 2011 to lease ten trams to Transport for London for use on Tramlink.

In April 2010, the first tram was delivered and displayed at the Princes Street stop at the bottom of The Mound, before being moved to open storage in Broxburn. The 27th tram was delivered in December 2012. 
The trams have wrapped advertisements for promoting local events and commercial advertising.

Fares and ticketing

Fare structure
Ticketing and fares are integrated with Lothian Buses. A proof of payment system applies. The single fare is the same as on Lothian Buses for most rides, and day tickets and Ridacards are valid on trams and buses. However the tram fare from the centre to the airport is more expensive than the bus, costing £6.50 one-way.

The "Ridacard" is a smartcard season ticket issued by Transport for Edinburgh; it is valid on both Edinburgh Trams and Lothian Buses (available for 1 week, 4 weeks or annually). On 1 September 2014, a rechargeable pre-paid smartcard for single journeys on both buses and trams, called "Citysmart", was introduced.

Free travel is available to holders of City of Edinburgh Council-issued Scottish National Entitlement Cards which are eligible for concessionary travel, and for a companion travelling with the cardholder of National Entitlement Cards with a companion entitlement. Passengers with National Entitlement Cards eligible for concessionary travel but issued by other local authorities are not offered any fare concession, with the exception of blind or visually impaired cardholders.

An "onboard fare" of £10 is charged to passengers who have not pre-purchased a ticket or validated either a Ridacard, a National Entitlement Card or an m-ticket before boarding.

Ticket machines

At the request of Lothian Buses, installation of 30 ticket machines at key bus stops began in 2007. Passengers had to purchase tickets before boarding the bus, reducing dwell times, but the machines were not popular with users and were scrapped in 2011. Consideration was given to installing similar on-street ticket machines, and new, advanced machines (capable of reading smartcards and accepting credit/debit cards) were installed in early 2014 at each tram stop. The new ticket machines are the Galexio-Plus type supplied by Flowbird Transport Ltd. Ticket machines do not accept banknotes or give change. The minimum spend for a card transaction was originally £3 which was more than the cost for a single ticket. The minimum spend was scrapped in September 2019 following complaints from customers and negative press comments.

Services
Services run every 7 minutes throughout the entire line, between St Andrew Square and Edinburgh Airport.

Bicycle policy
In May and June 2015 cyclists were allowed to board the trams with their bikes, during a trial period which was supported by cycle campaign groups Spokes and Pedal on Parliament. Following this, Edinburgh trams became the first modern tram network in the UK to permit the carriage of bikes on a permanent basis, with up to two bicycles being allowed per tram outwith peak hours (7.30 am to 9.30 am, and 4 pm to 6.30 pm) and excluding the period of the Edinburgh Festival and Fringe (usually 3½ weeks during August) and other large events.

Corporate affairs

Ownership and structure
Edinburgh Trams Limited is a wholly owned subsidiary company of Transport for Edinburgh Limited. By virtue of its controlling interest in the parent's equity capital, the City of Edinburgh Council is the ultimate controlling party.

Business trends
The key trends for Edinburgh Trams Limited since it commenced operations in May 2014 are (years ending 31 December):

Edinburgh Trams made a pre-tax profit of £252,000 for 2016, against a predicted loss of £170,000, which meant that profitability had been achieved two years ahead of schedule. This was based on excluding maintenance and infrastructure costs. Including these, as has been done since 2018 when these costs were shifted to Edinburgh Trams, the small operating profit (£3m) has turned to a large operating loss (e.g. − £9.4 million in 2018). It has not achieved an operating profit since full costing.

Staffing
Fifty-two ticket inspectors have been recruited to prevent fare dodging. Edinburgh Council is aiming for a 3% fare evasion rate, lower than any other tramway in Britain. Thirty-two drivers were employed, after passing psychological tests designed to eliminate risk-takers.

Accidents and incidents
Frequent accidents involving cyclists and the tramway have been reported since the opening of the system in 2014. These are  typically caused by bicycle wheels getting stuck in the rails or by bikes skidding on the rails. A study published in 2018 found that, up to April 2016, 191 cyclists in Edinburgh had suffered  tramway-related accidents serious enough to require hospital treatment. In September 2022, using Freedom of Information data, the BBC reported that there had been 422 accidents involving cyclists on the tram tracks, as a result of which 196 cyclists had made successful claims against Edinburgh City Council, resulting in £1,262,141 being paid in damages.

 On 29 August 2014, a bus and tram collided in the West End of Edinburgh, causing severe traffic congestion.
 On 31 May 2017, a medical student was killed in Princes Street when she fell into the path of a minibus after her bike wheels got stuck in the tram rails.
 On 13 June 2018, a bus and tram collided near Edinburgh Airport, seriously injuring the bus driver.
 On 11 September 2018, a pedestrian was killed by a tram on a crossing near Saughton tram stop. The Rail Accident Investigation Branch determined that the tram's warning bell was not loud enough, and that Edinburgh Trams should better monitor risks at crossings.

See also

Edinburgh Airport Rail Link
Light Rail Transit Association
List of Tramways in Scotland
Proposals for new tram lines in Edinburgh
Edinburgh Tram Inquiry
Scottish Tramway and Transport Society
Transport in Edinburgh

References

External links

Auditor Generals Report on Tram Scheme June 2007
Edinburgh Tram (Line One) Bill Committee
Edinburgh Tram (Line Two) Bill Committee
Edinburgh Tram (Line One) Act 2006
Edinburgh Tram (Line Two) Act 2006
Gallery of Edingburgh's Trams

 
Airport rail links in the United Kingdom
Light rail in the United Kingdom
Public inquiries in Scotland
Railway lines opened in 2014
Tram transport in Scotland
Transport in Edinburgh
2014 establishments in Scotland
Controversies in Scotland
750 V DC railway electrification
Electric railways in the United Kingdom